The 1977 Tonga earthquake took place on 22 June at 12:08:33 UTC some 200 km southwest of Tongatapu, which shocks infecting all islands of the kingdom of Tonga. The earthquake measured 8.0 on the moment magnitude scale and had a maximum intensity of VIII (Severe) on the Mercalli intensity scale.

The earthquake caused considerable damage to the infrastructures and some fatalities in most Tongan islands, with the most damage in Tongatapu and ʻEua and the least damage in Ha'apai and Vava'u.

See also
List of earthquakes in 1977
List of earthquakes in Tonga
Louisville Ridge

References

Further reading

External links 

Earthquakes in Tonga
1977 earthquakes
1977 in Tonga 
1977 disasters in Oceania